Tytthoscincus parvus is a species of skink. It is found in Indonesia.

References

parvus
Endemic fauna of Indonesia
Reptiles of Indonesia
Reptiles described in 1897
Taxa named by George Albert Boulenger